Jaroslav Dvořák (born 1957) is a Czech politician and former neurologist.

Biography 
Dvořák worked as a doctor and a neurologist and cited health concerns as a reason for becoming interested in politics. He first joined the TOP 09 party and unsuccessfully ran for Valašské Meziříčí City Council in 2010 but was not elected. He later joined the SPD party. He has been a member of the Chamber of Deputies for the SPD since 2017 and a member of Zlín Region Council since 2016.

References 

1959 births
Living people
21st-century Czech politicians
Freedom and Direct Democracy MPs
Czech surgeons
Members of the Chamber of Deputies of the Czech Republic (2021–2025)
Members of the Chamber of Deputies of the Czech Republic (2017–2021)